Birdford is an extinct town in Tattnall County, in the U.S. state of Georgia.

History
A post office called Birdford was established in 1880, and remained in operation until 1907. The community had a depot on the Register and Glennville Railroad.

References

Landforms of Tattnall County, Georgia